Illalu is a 1940 Telugu-language drama film directed by Gudavalli Ramabrahmam.

Plot
Murthy (Umamaheswara Rao) is married to Indira (Kanachanamala) and they live happily. Subsequently, he falls in love with Leela (Lakshmi Rajyam), an educated and sophisticated lady. He brings her home as his second wife, making Indira unhappy. However Indira performs her duties as the devoted housewife on one side and wins over her husband with patience and perseverance. Finally Indira emerges successful and they lived happily.

Cast

Soundtrack

There are some melodious songs written by Tapi Dharma Rao. Music is scored by S. Rajeswara Rao.
 "Dina Dinamu Papadni Deevinchipondi Devalokamuloni Devathallaara'' (Singer: Kanchanamala)
 "Jalavihagaali Gaana Vinoda" (Singers: Umamaheswara Rao and Lakshmi Rajyam)
 "Kavyapaanamu Chesi Kaipekkinaane" (Singers: Rajeswara Rao and Balasaraswati)
 "Koyilokasari Vachi Koosi Poyane" (Singer: S. Varalakshmi)
 "Neepai Mohamuno Krishna Nilupagalemoyi Krishna" (Singers: P. Suribabu and S. Varalakshmi)
 "Suma Komala Kanulela Kala Kaadanuma Bala" (Singers: Rajeswara Rao and Balasaraswati)

Box office
 It was a  hit those days, resulting in production of many films with similar concept.

References

External links
 Illalu 1940 film at IMDb.

1940s Telugu-language films
1940 films
Indian black-and-white films
Indian drama films
1940 drama films